Ricky Lallawmawma (born 9 September 1991) is an Indian professional footballer who plays as a defender for Indian Super League club Jamshedpur.

Career
Born in Mizoram, Lallawmawma started his career with Aizawl where he was named captain. He then moved to local rivals, Chanmari in 2014. He then moved again to Zo United of the Mizoram Premier League in 2015. He then moved back to Aizawl after they gained promotion to the I-League.

Lallawmawma made his professional debut for Aizawl in the I-League on 9 January 2016 against the reigning champions, Mohun Bagan. He came on in the 37th minute as Aizawl lost 3–1.

On 23 December 2016 he signed for DSK Shivajians for I-League 2017.

On 17 August 2017 he signed for Mohun Bagan for I-League 2018.

Ricky signed for ATK in the 2018–19 season putting on some stellar performances on his debut ISL season, registering 17 appearances for the Kolkata based club.

After failing to establish his name in the Starting 11 for ATK in their title winning 2019-20 campaign, he joined Jamshedpur ahead of the 2020–21 season where he made the left back position his own.

Honours

Jamshedpur
Indian Super League Premiers: 2021-22

References

External links 
 ZoFooty Profile

1991 births
Living people
Indian footballers
Aizawl FC players
Chanmari FC players
Association football defenders
Footballers from Mizoram
I-League 2nd Division players
I-League players
Indian Super League players
ATK (football club) players
DSK Shivajians FC players
Mohun Bagan AC players
Jamshedpur FC players